England Counties XV is a representative rugby union team, formed in 2002, open to English players who play in the County Championship and the third tier (and below) of the English rugby union system. Players from the Premiership and RFU Championship are ineligible.

2019 matches

2018 matches

2017 matches

2016 matches

2015 matches

The England Counties squad for the tour of Romania was:

Forwards: Matthew Beesley (Wharefdale & Cheshire), David Laverick (Hull Ionians & Yorkshire), Stephen Johnson (Hull Ionians & Yorkshire), Craig Williams (Redruth & Cornwall), Andrew Berry (Old Albanians & Hertfordshire), Brett McNamee (Old Albanians & Hertfordshire), Samuel Wilkes (Cinderford & Gloucestershire), Ben Hilton (Launceston & Cornwall), Christopher Wearmouth (Blaydon& Durham), George Oram (Blackheath & Kent), Keith Laughlin (Blaydon & Northumberland), Gavin Jones (Blaydon & Yorkshire), Evan Stewart (Fylde & Lancashire), Harry Bate (Blaydon & Northumberland), Nyle Davidson (Caldy & Cheshire).

Backs: William Crow (Dorking & Surrey), Matthew Shepherd (Launceston & Cornwall), Alexander Gallagher (Blackheath & Kent), Sebastian Rodwell (London Irish Wild Geese & Gloucestershire), James Spiers (Old Albanians & Hertfordshire), Samuel Winter (Bishop Stortford & Hertfordshire), Leo Fielding (Cinderford & Gloucestershire), Albert Portsmouth (Cambridge & Eastern Counties), Nevaro Codlin (Coney Hill & Gloucestershire), Jordan Dorrington (Fylde & Lancashire), Henry Robinson (Darlington Mowden Park & Hertfordshire), Michael Wilcox (Cinderford & Gloucestershire).

2014 matches

2013 matches
The England Counties squad for the Belgium tour in June 2013 was:

Forwards: Harry Broadbent (Caldy & Cheshire)
Royce Cadman (Hull Ionians & Yorkshire)
Mark George* (Stourbridge & Gloucestershire)
Matt Hall* (Blaydon & Northumberland)
Michael Hill (Birmingham Bees and North Midlands) 
Ben Hilton* (Launceston & Cornwall)
Steve Hipwell (Cambridge & Eastern Counties)
Darren Jacques* (Redruth & Cornwall)
Robbie Kalbraier* (Blaydon & Northumberland)
Adam Kettle (Doncaster & Cheshire)
James Lindfield (Blackheath & Kent)
Brett McNamee (Old Albanian & Hertfordshire)
Tom Stradwick* (Blackheath & Kent)
Chris Wearmouth*(Blaydon & Durham)

Backs: Drew Cheshire (Luctonians & North Midlands)
Nevaro Codlin (Cinderford & Gloucestershire)
Chris Hallam (Doncaster & Yorkshire)
Chris Harris (Tynedale & Northumberland)
Matt Heeks* (Rosslyn Park & Eastern Counties)
Chris Johnson* (Fylde & Lancashire)
Rhys Owen (Loughborough & North Midlands)
Heath Stevens (Plymouth & East Midlands)
Sean Taylor (Preston & Lancashire)
Ollie Thomas* (Moseley & North Midlands)
Nielson Webber (Launceston & Cornwall)
Jim Wigglesworth* (Cambridge & Yorkshire) *Capped by the England Counties

The England Counties squad for the February matches was:
Forwards Dave Allen (Blackheath); Tom Fidler (Cambridge); Mark George (Stourbridge); Matt Hall (Blaydon); James Inglis (Esher); Billy Johnson (Old Albanian); Robbie Kalbraier (Blaydon); Alex Loney (Fylde); Sam Shires (Ealing Trailfinders); Ollie Stedman (Tynedale); Will Warden (Richmond); Ben West (Cinderford).
Backs Jack Adams (Cinderford); Lewis Barker (Coventry); Scott Barrow (Fylde); Nev Edwards (Rosslyn Park); Chris Elder (Esher); Matt Heeks (Rosslyn Park); Peter Hodgkinson (Ealing Trailfinders); Will Hurrell (Stourbridge); Ollie Marchon (Old Albanian); Rory Teague (Blackheath).

2012 Tour of East Africa
The team toured East Africa in early June 2012.  While there they played a match against the East Africa rugby union team which, though established in 1950 and having previously faced the British Lions (twice), the Springboks, Wales and the Barbarians, was playing its first fixture in almost exactly 30 years The tour was designed to aid this region re-ignite its rugby heritage.

2012 Matches 

The England Counties squad was: 
Forwards Rob Baldwin (Wharfedale & Yorkshire)
Joe Bonner*^ (Blackheath & Kent)
Richard Boyle^ (Newcastle Falcons & Northumberland)
James Cleverly (Blackheath & Kent)
David Dickinson* (Tynedale & Northumberland)
Billy Johnson (Unattached & Hertfordshire)
James Lindfield (Westcombe Park & Kent)
Dave Marwick (Stockport & Cheshire)
Louis McGowan*^ (Sedgley Park & Lancashire)
Ben Pons (Moseley & North Mids)
Gareth Rawlings (Fylde & Lancashire)
Jared Saunders (Saracens & Hertfordshire)
Craig Voisey^ (Moseley & North Mids)
Sam Wilkes* (Cinderford & Gloucestershire)
Backs
Chris Briers*^ (Fylde & Lancashire)
Will Burton (Luctonians & North Mids)
Phil Chesters* (Ealing & Devon)
Steve Hamilton^ (Unattached & Yorkshire)
Peter Hodgkinson*^ (Ealing & Cheshire)
Toby Howley-Berridge (Unattached & Eastern Counties)
Stefan Liebenberg* (Bedford & Hertfordshire)
Harry Peck*^ (Tynedale & Northumberland)
Jack Smales^ (Nevers & Northumberland)
Rory Teague (Cinderford & Gloucestershire)
Tom Wheatcroft* (Ealing & Warwickshire)
Jim Wigglesworth (Hull & Yorkshire)
Players on standby
Rob Schillachi^ (Hertford & Hertfordshire); Jamie Salter (Launceston & Cornwall); Chris Wearmouth* (Blaydon & Durham); Gavin Jones (Blaydon & Yorkshire); Philip Woodhead* (Wharfedale & Yorkshire); Tyson Lewis (Plymouth & Devon)
 Key * Represented England Counties in Spring Internationals  ^ Represented England Counties on previous Tour

2011 Tour of Spain

The England Counties squad was:
Forwards: Rob Baldwin (Wharfedale & Yorkshire), Daegan Beaumont (Worthing & Sussex), Richard Boyle (Tynedale & Northumberland), Matt Hall (Blaydon & Northumberland), Ben Hilton (Launceston & Cornwall), Martin Kent (Macclesfield & Cheshire), Aaron Myers (Westoe & Durham), Steve Pape (Rosslyn Park & Somerset), Jack Preece (Birmingham Solihull & Gloucestershire), Rob Schillaci (Hertford & Hertfordshire), Ben Sparks (Stourbridge & Gloucestershire), Tom Stradwick (Henley & Kent), Tommy Taylor (Sale Jets & Cheshire), Craig Voisey (Moseley & North Midlands), Gavin Woods ( Caldy & Cheshire).
Backs: Oliver Brennand (Fylde & Lancashire), Gareth Collins (Leicester Lions & Warwickshire) (Captain), Steve Hamilton (Rotherham & Kent), Peter Hodgkinson (Ealing & Cheshire), Tom Hughes (Preston Grasshoppers & Lancashire), Cameron Mitchell (Plymouth Albion & North Midlands), Charlie Mulchrone (Macclesfield & Cheshire), Fergus Mulchrone (unattached & Cheshire), Harry Peck (Tynedale & Northumberland), Aaron Penberthy (Redruth & Cornwall), Ollie Thomas (Moseley & North Midlands), Curtis Wilson (Leeds & Yorkshire).

England Counties have met the Spanish national side once previously. Both took part in a FIRA Festival in southwestern France in 2007, when the Counties were 21–15 winners in Morlaàs.

2010 Tour of Canada

2009 Tour of Korea and Japan

2008 FIRA/AER Rugby Festival in France

2008 Tour of USA and Canada

2007 Tour of Russia

The England Counties squad was Forwards: Neil Spence (Yorkshire & Bradford & Bingley), Chris Rainbow (Hertfordshire & Newbury), Mike Blakeburn (Surrey & Esher), Chris Morgan ( Somerset & Newbury), Gregor Hayter ( Oxfordshire & Newbury), James Winterbottom (Middlesex & Henley), David Campton (Warwickshire & Coventry), Alex Davidson (North Midlands & Pertemps Bees), James Tideswell (North Midlands & Stourbridge), Carl Rimmer (Warwickshire & Coventry), Tim Mathias (Devon & Plymouth Albion), Liam Wordley (Staffordshire & Henley), Glenn Cooper (Somerset & Newbury), Duncan Cormack (Surrey & Esher) captain. Backs: Oliver Viney (Lancashire & Preston Grasshoppers), Frankie Neale (Kent & Blackheath), Tom Jarvis (Gloucestershire & Lydney), Hamish Smales (Northumberland & Tynedale), Chris Malherbe (Yorkshire & Wharfedale), Aaran Cruickshank (Devon & Plymouth Albion), Mark Bedworth (Yorkshire & Wharfedale), Scott Rawlings (Staffordshire & Manchester), Mark Woodrow (Gloucestershire & Doncaster), Matthew Leek (Surrey & Esher), Paul Knight (Gloucestershire & Moseley), Chris Pilgrim (Cheshire & Loughborough University).

England Counties under-20

England Counties under-18

References

External links
 
 

2002 establishments in England
Counties
County Championship (rugby union)